Ford's Theatre is a theater located in Washington, D.C., which opened in August 1863. The theater is infamous for being the site of the assassination of Abraham Lincoln. On the night of April 14, 1865, John Wilkes Booth entered the theater box where Lincoln and his wife were watching a performance of Our American Cousin, slipped the single-shot, 5.87-inch derringer from his pocket and fired at Lincoln's head. After being shot, the fatally wounded Lincoln was carried across the street to the Petersen House, where he died the next morning.

The theater was later used as a warehouse and government office building. In 1893, part of its interior flooring collapsed, causing 22 deaths, and needed repairs were made. The building became a museum in 1932, and it was renovated and re-opened as a theater in 1968. A related Center for Education and Leadership museum opened February 12, 2012, next to Petersen House.

The Petersen House and the theater are preserved together as Ford's Theatre National Historic Site, administered by the National Park Service; programming within the theater and the Center for Education is overseen separately by the Ford's Theatre Society.

History 

The site was originally a house of worship, constructed in 1833 as the second meeting house of the First Baptist Church of Washington, with Obadiah Bruen Brown as the pastor. In 1861, after the congregation moved to a newly built structure, John T. Ford bought the former church and renovated it into a theater. He first called it Ford's Athenaeum. It was destroyed by fire in 1862, and was rebuilt.

Assassination of President Lincoln 

On April 14, 1865—just five days after General Lee's surrender at Appomattox Court House—Lincoln and his wife attended a performance of Our American Cousin at Ford's Theatre. The famous actor John Wilkes Booth, desperate to aid the dying Confederacy, made his way into the presidential box and shot Lincoln. Booth then jumped down to the stage, and escaped through a rear door. This was witnessed by many, including 5-year-old Samuel J. Seymour who lived to 1956, becoming the last witness to the Lincoln assassination. 

Following the assassination, the United States Government appropriated the theater. Congress paid Ford $88,000 in compensation, and an order was issued forever prohibiting its use as a place of public amusement. Between 1866 and 1887, the theater was taken over by the U.S. military and served as a facility for the War Department with records kept on the first floor, the Library of the Surgeon General's Office on the second floor, and the Army Medical Museum on the third. In 1887, the building exclusively became a clerk's office for the Record and Pension Office of the War Department when the medical departments moved out.

Disrepair and restoration 
On June 9, 1893, the front section of the three interior floors collapsed when a supporting pillar was undermined during excavation of the cellar, killing 22 clerks and injuring another 68. This led some people to believe that the former church turned theater and storeroom was cursed. The building was repaired and Record and Pension Office clerks were moved back on July 30, 1894.

In 1928, the building was turned over from the War Department Office to the Office of Public Buildings and Parks of the National Capital. A Lincoln museum opened on the first floor of the theater building on February 12, 1932—Lincoln's 123rd birthday. In 1933, the building was transferred to the National Park Service.

The restoration of Ford's Theatre was brought about by the two-decade-long lobbying efforts of Democratic National Committeeman Melvin D. Hildreth and Republican North Dakota Representative Milton Young. Hildreth first suggested to Young the need for its restoration in 1945. Through extensive lobbying of Congress, a bill was passed in 1955 to prepare an engineering study for the reconstruction of the building. In 1964, Congress approved funds for its restoration, which began that year and was completed in 1968.

On January 21, 1968, Vice President Hubert Humphrey and 500 others dedicated the restored theater. The theater reopened on January 30, 1968, with a gala performance.
The presidential box is never occupied.

The theater was again renovated during the 2000s. It has a current seating capacity of 665. The re-opening ceremony was on February 11, 2009, which commemorated Lincoln's 200th birthday. The event featured remarks from President Barack Obama as well as appearances by Katie Couric, Kelsey Grammer, James Earl Jones, Ben Vereen, Jeffrey Wright, the President's Own Marine Band, Joshua Bell, Patrick Lundy and the Ministers of Music, Audra McDonald and Jessye Norman.

Ford's Theatre National Historic Site 
The National Historic Site consisting of two contributing buildings, the theater and the Petersen House, was designated in 1932.

The Ford's Theatre Museum beneath the theater contains portions of the Olroyd Collection of Lincolniana. Most recently renovated for a July 2009 reopening, the Museum is run through a partnership with the National Park Service and the private non-profit 501(c)(3) Ford's Theatre Society. The collection includes multiple items related to the assassination, including the Derringer pistol used to carry out the shooting, Booth's diary and the original door to Lincoln's theater box. In addition, a number of Lincoln's family items, his coat (without the blood-stained pieces), some statues of Lincoln and several large portraits of the President are on display in the museum. The blood-stained pillow from the President's deathbed is in the Ford's Theatre Museum. In addition to covering the assassination conspiracy, the renovated museum focuses on Lincoln's arrival in Washington, his presidential cabinet, family life in the White House and his role as orator and emancipator. The museum also features exhibits about Civil War milestones and generals and about the building's history as a theatrical venue. The rocking chair in which Lincoln was sitting is now on display at The Henry Ford Museum in Dearborn, Michigan.

Petersen House 

After Lincoln was shot, doctors had soldiers carry him into the street in search of a house in which he would be more comfortable. A man on the steps of the house of tailor William Petersen beckoned to them. They took Lincoln into the first-floor bedroom and laid him on the beddiagonally because of his unusual height. Many people came to visit him throughout the night before he died the following morning at 7:22 a.m.

The Petersen House was purchased by the U.S. government in 1896 as the "House Where Lincoln Died", being the federal government's first purchase of a historic home.
The National Park Service has operated it as a historic house museum since 1933, the rooms furnished as on the night Lincoln died.

See also 
Abraham Lincoln Birthplace National Historic Site
Abraham Lincoln Presidential Library and Museum
Lincoln Boyhood National Memorial
Lincoln Home National Historic Site
Lincoln Memorial
Lincoln Memorial University
Lincoln Tomb
Mount Rushmore
National Register of Historic Places listings in central Washington, D.C.
Theater in Washington, D.C.
President Lincoln's Cottage
Presidential memorials in the United States

References

External links 

Official NPS website: Ford's Theatre National Historic Site
Ford's Theatre Society including Center for Education and Leadership, theater Box Office
The 1893 collapse of Ford's Theatre
Abraham Lincoln's Assassination
The Life and Plot of John Wilkes Booth
Podcast with the curator of Ford's Theatre from the Speaking of History Podcast – MP3 file
Podcast of the Ranger Talk for visitors from Ford's Theatre from the Speaking of History Podcast
Ford's Theatre at Google Cultural Institute

1861 establishments in Washington, D.C.
Assassination of Abraham Lincoln
Assassination sites
Churches completed in 1833
Former churches in Washington, D.C.
Georgian Revival architecture in Washington, D.C.
History museums in Washington, D.C.
League of Washington Theatres
Members of the Cultural Alliance of Greater Washington
Monuments and memorials to Abraham Lincoln in the United States
National Historic Sites in Washington, D.C.
National Mall and Memorial Parks
Neoclassical architecture in Washington, D.C.
Penn Quarter
Presidential museums in Washington, D.C.
Theatres on the National Register of Historic Places in Washington, D.C.
Tourist attractions in Washington, D.C.
United States National Medal of Arts recipients
Victorian architecture in Washington, D.C.
Washington, D.C., in the American Civil War